Annabel Mary Dibdin Heseltine (born 25 July 1963) is a journalist, columnist and TV and radio broadcaster. She is editor of the education magazine School House.

Early life
Born in London, she is the elder daughter of the politician and former deputy Prime Minister Lord Heseltine and Lady Heseltine, née Anne Williams. She was educated at Cobham Hall School, Tudor Hall and Stowe School. At Stowe she achieved a B in Economics, a C in Politics, and two Ds in History and Geography in her A-levels, grades which she described as "atrocious by today's standards". She suspects that, like her children, she is dyslexic. In 1985 Heseltine graduated from Durham University with a degree in Economic History. In 2006 she obtained an MSc (distinction) in Wildlife Management and Conservation at University of Reading.

Career 
Heseltine trained as a fashion buyer at Bloomingdales in New York and then worked in London for advertising agency, Darcy Masius, Benton and Bowles in London and Restaurant and Hotel PR agency, Alan Crompton-Batt Associates.

Aged 22, she became the Assistant-editor for the Hong Kong Tatler. From 1990 - 2006, Heseltine worked for broadsheets and tabloids including the Daily Mails YOU magazine, The Times, Sunday Times and The Daily Telegraph. and also magazines including Vogue, The Economist, the New Statesman, Earth Magazine, Harpers and Queen and Hi-Life. Following her coverage of the outbreak of Rwandan civil war, she became a news reporter at The Sunday Times.

As a single woman during the 1990s Bridget Jones phenomenon, Heseltine epitomised the phenomenon being an unmarried career woman in her early thirties and was quick to capitalise on a fascination with this new breed of woman who seemed to have it all but was now losing it all.

Later she was one of the first people to talk to about the sorrows of an ectopic pregnancy. Her own experiences as an older mother unable to conceive a live baby and subsequent walk down the IVF route was well documented. Her advocacy of the legalisation of drugs led her father, while deputy prime minister, to dissociate himself from her opinions on the issue.

She was one of the founding editors for the upmarket concierge company, Quintessentially.

As a commentator and TV and radio broadcaster she has appeared on news and chat shows including The World at One, The Today Programme, Panorama, BBC News 24, Woman's Hour, discussing current affairs and subjects as diverse as IVF, dyslexia, Single Women, Aids in Zambia, footballers, the fur industry and the 1997 Hong Kong hand over.

Heseltine is the editor of School House Magazine, which seeks "to offer parents real insight into the world of independent education."

Personal life
Heseltine is divorced and lives between London and West Wiltshire with her four children all of whom have been diagnosed with dyslexia. She was previously married to Irish plastic surgeon Peter Butler.

She is entitled to use the honorific style "The Honorable" by virtue of her father's barony.

References

External links 
School House Magazine

1963 births
Living people
British journalists
Daughters of life peers
Alumni of St Mary's College, Durham
Alumni of the University of Reading
People educated at Cobham Hall School
People educated at Stowe School
Writers with dyslexia